Johan Malcolm Dixelius (born 23 April 1948 in Frösö, Sweden) is a Swedish journalist, documentary filmmaker and Russia expert.

In 1972, Dixelius started his career in journalism as a reporter on the local public service TV station in Gothenburg (Västnytt) and later in Sundsvall (Mittnytt). He is best known as a Moscow correspondent for Swedish public radio and television in the 1970s, 1980s and 1990s. He also worked for TV4 in the 1990s and for Viasat during the Sochi Winter Olympics in 2014.

After twenty years in public radio and TV, Dixelius switched to documentary filmmaking in 1993, founding his own production company, Dixit International. He has received awards and acclaim for several films, including Russian Mafia (1994), CCCP Hockey (2004) and A Bitter Taste of Freedom (2011). 1999-2001 he produced a trailblazing international affairs series for TV4 called pangea.nu. From 2003 Dixelius is involved with Deep Sea Productions, where he has produced the series Wreck Hunters (Swe. Vrakletarna, 2007) as well as directing and producing a number of documentary films for the international market.

Together with Russian journalist and writer Andrei Konstantinov, Dixelius has written two books on organized crime in Russia.

Since 2015, he is the chairman of the Malik Bendjelloul Memorial Foundation, which runs a fund in support of documentary filmmakers.

Education 
Gothenburg Institute of Journalism, 1970-72 journalism

Uppsala University, 1969-70 Russian, English

Army Interpreter School, 1968-69 Russian

University of Georgia (Henry W Grady School of Journalism), 1966-67 journalism

Atlantic College, 1963-65 A-levels

Employment 
SVT 1, 1990-93 correspondent, Moscow

SVT 1, 1984-1990 reporter, international editor

SVT, 1983-84 correspondent, Moscow

Sveriges Radio, 1979-83 correspondent, Moscow

Författarcentrum Norr, 1978-79 consultant

Mittnytt (SVT, Sundsvall), 1973-78 reporter

Västnytt (SVT, Gothenburg), 1972-73 reporter

Documentary films (selection) 
Taikon (2015), executive producer

Mars the Magnificent (2015), producer

Crossroads (2014), producer

The Land that is No More (2012), executive producer

Return of the Ghost Ship (2011), director

A Bitter Taste of Freedom (2011), producer

Women with Cows (2011), script, executive producer

The Cuban colonel, the Russian General and the (near) Destruction of the World (2011), director, producer

Route of Death (2011), producer

The Mystery of the Lost Spy Plane (2011), director

Being Anja Pärson (2010), executive producer

Königsegg (2009), director

Profession: High Jumper (2009), director

The Horseman (2007), executive producer

The Virus Hunter (2006), director

The Laser Man Documentary (2005), director, producer

Homeward Bound (2005), producer

Mr IKEA, the Man Who Wanted to Furnish the World (2004), director, producer

CCCP Hockey (2004), director

Girls in Jeopardy (2002), producer

The Prince (2001), producer

Conquering the Arctic (2000), director

North East Passage (1994), director, producer

Russian Mafia (1994), director, producer

Books 
Russia’s Underworld, Malcolm Dixelius and Andrej Konstantinov, Stockholm 1994

Mafialand Russia, Malcolm Dixelius and Andrej Konstantinov, Stockholm 1997

References

External links 
Malcolm Dixelius on the Internet Movie Database 
 The Malik Fund

Living people
1948 births
Swedish journalists
People educated at Atlantic College